The International Conference on Autonomous Agents and Multiagent Systems or AAMAS is the leading scientific conference for research in the areas of artificial intelligence, autonomous agents, and multiagent systems. It is annually organized by a non-profit organization called the International Foundation for Autonomous Agents and Multiagent Systems (IFAAMAS).

History 
The AAMAS conference is a merger of three major international conferences/workshops, namely International Conference on Autonomous Agents (AGENTS), International Conference on Multi-Agent Systems (ICMAS), and International Workshop on Agent Theories, Architectures, and Languages (ATAL). As such, this highly respected joint conference provides a quality forum for discussing research in this area.

Current and previous conferences 
 2020: Auckland, New Zealand (May 9–13)
 2019: Montreal, Canada (May 13–17)
 2018: Stockholm, Sweden (July 10–15)
 2017: São Paulo, Brazil
 2016: Singapore City, Singapore 
 2015: Istanbul, Turkey 
 2014: Paris, France 
 2013: Saint Paul, USA 
 2012: Valencia, Spain
 2011: Taipei, Taiwan
 2010: Toronto, Canada
 2009: Budapest, Hungary
 2008: Estoril, Portugal
 2007: Honolulu, USA
 2006: Hakodate, Japan
 2005: Utrecht, The Netherlands
 2004: New York, USA
 2003: Melbourne, Australia
 2002: Bologna, Italy

Activities 

Besides the main program that consists of a main track, an industry and applications track, and a couple of special area tracks, AAMAS also hosts over 20 workshops (e.g., AOSE, COIN, DALT, ProMAS, to mention a few) and many tutorials. There is also a demonstration session and a doctoral symposium. Finally, each year AAMAS features a bunch of awards, most notably the IFAAMAS Influential Paper Award. It publishes proceedings which are available online.

See also 
 The list of computer science conferences contains other academic conferences in computer science.

References

External links
 

Artificial intelligence
Electronic design automation conferences